Cynthia Felgate (8 October 1935, Birmingham – 2 November 1991, Weedon Lois, Northamptonshire) was a British television producer, later executive producer, known for working on children's television programmes such as Play School and for creating Playbus (later Playdays) for the BBC with her own production company, Felgate Productions.

She was also connected to the production of programmes such as Camberwick Green and Postman Pat.

In 1983, she was nominated for a BAFTA for her production work on Play School.

In 2006, a character in the BBC series Hustle was named after her.

References

External links 

1935 births
1991 deaths
British television producers
British women television producers
20th-century British businesspeople